Asim Khan (born 29 October 1996, in Lahore) is a Pakistani professional squash player. As of February 2018, he was ranked number 106 in the world.

References

External links 
 

1996 births
Living people
Pakistani male squash players
Asian Games medalists in squash
Asian Games bronze medalists for Pakistan
Squash players at the 2018 Asian Games
Medalists at the 2018 Asian Games
South Asian Games gold medalists for Pakistan
South Asian Games medalists in squash
21st-century Pakistani people